"El Cóndor Pasa" (Spanish for "The Condor Passes") is an orchestral musical piece from the zarzuela El Cóndor Pasa by the Peruvian composer Daniel Alomía Robles, written in 1913 and based on traditional Andean music, specifically folk music from Peru.

Since then, it has been estimated that, around the world, more than 4,000 versions of the melody have been produced, along with 300 sets of lyrics. In 2004, Peru declared this song to be a part of their national cultural heritage. This song is now considered the second national anthem of Peru.

It is the best-known Peruvian song in the English-speaking world, due to a 1970 cover by Simon & Garfunkel on their Bridge over Troubled Water album. Their version is called "El Cóndor Pasa (If I Could)".

Original zarzuela version
In 1913, Peruvian songwriter Daniel Alomía Robles composed "El Cóndor Pasa", and the song was first performed publicly at the Teatro Mazzi in Lima. The song was originally a musical piece in the Peruvian zarzuela (musical play), El cóndor pasa.

Its music was composed by Daniel Alomía Robles in 1913 and its script was written by Julio de La Paz (pseudonym of the Limenian dramatist Julio Baudouin). The piano arrangement of this play's most famous melody was legally registered on May 3, 1933, by The Edward B. Marks Music Corp. in the Library of Congress, under the number 9643. The zarzuela is written in prose and consists of one musical play and two acts.

In July 2013, the Colectivo Cultural Centenario El Cóndor Pasa cultural association re-edited the original script which had been lost for a period of time, and published it together with a CD containing the recorded dialogues and seven musical pieces. The music from the original score was reconstructed by musicologist Luis Salazar Mejía with the collaboration of musicians Daniel Dorival and Claude Ferrier and the support of cultural promoter Mario Cerrón Fetta, and re-released on November 14, 15, and 16, 2013 at the Teatro UNI in Lima to celebrate its first centenary. The zarzuela included the famous melody of the same name, without lyrics, based on the traditional Andean music of Peru, where it was declared a National Cultural Heritage in 2004.

Simon and Garfunkel version

In 1965, the American pop musician Paul Simon heard for the first time a version of the melody by the band Los Incas in a performance at the 
in Paris in which both were participating. Simon became friendly with the band, later even touring with them and producing their first US-American album. He asked the band for permission to use the piece in his production. The band's director and founding member , who was collecting royalties for the piece as co-author and arranger, responded erroneously that it was a traditional Peruvian composition. Milchberg told Simon he was registered as the arrangement's co-author and collected royalties.

In 1970, the Simon & Garfunkel duo recorded the Los Incas version, adding English lyrics which included Paul Simon in the author credits under the song name "El Cóndor Pasa (If I Could)". The instrumental version by Los Incas was used as the base track. They included the song on the 1970 album Bridge Over Troubled Water. Simon & Garfunkel released their version as a single in the US, which reached number 18 on the Billboard Pop Singles chart and number 6 on the Easy Listening chart, in fall 1970. This cover achieved major international success and fame.

In regard to the Simon & Garfunkel version, Daniel Alomía Robles, Jorge Milchberg, and Paul Simon are now all listed as songwriters, with Simon listed alone as the author of the English lyrics.

Copyright lawsuit
In late 1970, Daniel Alomía Robles' son Armando Robles Godoy, a Peruvian filmmaker, filed a successful copyright lawsuit against Paul Simon. The grounds for the lawsuit extended that the song had been composed by his father, who had copyrighted the song in the United States in 1933. Armando Robles Godoy said that he held no ill will towards Paul Simon for what he considered a "misunderstanding" and an "honest mistake".

"It was an almost friendly court case because Paul Simon was very respectful of other cultures. It was not carelessness on his part", said Armando Robles Godoy. "He happened to hear the song in Paris from a vernacular group Los Incas. He liked it, he went to ask the band for permission and they gave him the wrong information. Jorge Milchberg told him it was a traditional folk song from the 18th century and not my father's composition. It was a court case without further complications."

Later that year, Perry Como released a recording of Paul Simon's version on his album It's Impossible, while Julie Felix had a UK Top 20 hit with it, taking advantage of Simon & Garfunkel's decision not to release their version as a UK single.

Armando Robles Godoy subsequently wrote new Spanish lyrics for the song, taking Paul Simon's version as a reference.

Chart performance

Sales

References

Sources
Colectivo Cultural Centenario El Cóndor Pasa, ed. (2013). El cóndor pasa…Cien años después. Lima. . Registered in the National Library of Peru.
Salazar Mejía, Luis (2013). El misterio del cóndor: Memoria e historia de "El cóndor pasa…". Lima: Taky Onqoy Ediciones. . Registered in the National Library of Peru.
Cerrón Fetta, Mario (2014). Cuadernos de Música Peruana Nº 12. Lima.Editorial/ Cuadernos de Música. Register: Legal deposit Nº2008-06894. Registered in the National Library of Peru.

External links

Original version for piano (recording from 1933)

Andy Williams songs
Columbia Records singles
Number-one singles in Australia
Number-one singles in Germany
Number-one singles in Switzerland
Oricon International Singles Chart number-one singles
Perry Como songs
Peruvian songs
Simon & Garfunkel songs
Song recordings produced by Art Garfunkel
Song recordings produced by Paul Simon
Song recordings produced by Roy Halee
Songs about birds
Songs about South America
Spanish-language songs
1913 songs
1970 singles